Mishin is a rural locality (a khutor) in Mikhaylovka Urban Okrug, Volgograd Oblast, Russia. The population was 211 as of 2010. There are 7 streets.

Geography 
Mishin is located 49 km northeast of Mikhaylovka. 2-y Plotnikov is the nearest rural locality.

References 

Rural localities in Mikhaylovka urban okrug